Stefano Agostini (1614–1683) was a Roman Catholic cardinal.

Biography 
On 14 Jun 1671, he was consecrated bishop by Cesare Facchinetti, Bishop of Spoleto, with Mario Fani, Titular Bishop of Cyrene, and Nicola Lepori, Bishop of Saluzzo, serving as co-consecrators. 

He graduated in utroque iure from the University of Bologna and moved to Rome, where he had the support of his uncle, Cardinal Francesco Paolucci, and worked in various courts and offices of the Roman Curia.

Titular archbishop of Eraclea di Europa from 3 December 1669, Pope Innocent XI elevated him to the rank of a cardinal presbyter of the title of San Giovanni a Porta Latina in the consistory of 1 September 1681.

He died on 21 March 1683 at the age of 69 and was buried in the church of Santa Maria in Vallicella.

Episcopal genealogy 
The episcopal genealogy is:

 Bishop Melchor Soria Vera
 Bishop Diego Castejón Fonseca
 Cardinal Cesare Facchinetti
 Cardinal Stefano Agostini

References

1614 births
1683 deaths
17th-century Italian cardinals